Seth Small (born October 29, 1999) is a professional Canadian football placekicker for the Hamilton Tiger-Cats of the Canadian Football League (CFL).

College career 
Small played college football for the Texas A&M Aggies from 2018 to 2021. He played in 46 games where he was successful on 71 of 91 field goal attempts for a 78.0% completion rate and made a career long 52-yard field goal in his freshman year.

Professional career 
Following his collegiate career, Small was not selected in the 2021 NFL Draft. He attended mini-camp with the Indianapolis Colts, but he was not offered a contract. He then signed with the Hamilton Tiger-Cats on May 26, 2022. He played in both preseason games where he made all three field goal attempts, including a 51-yard try, but was released with the final cuts on June 5, 2022. After the team's incumbent kicker, Michael Domagala, struggled to begin the 2022 season, Small signed again with the team on July 10, 2022.

Small made his professional debut on July 16, 2022, against the Ottawa Redblacks, where he was successful on his only field goal attempt of 28 yards and made all three convert attempts. On August 26, 2022, he kicked a 58-yard field goal, against the Toronto Argonauts, which tied a franchise record for longest field goal made.

Personal life 
Small was born to parents Jennie Ann and Ricardo Small and has three sisters, Emma, Isabella and Della Grace. He married his wife, Rachel, in July 2021.

References

External links 
Hamilton Tiger-Cats bio

1999 births
Living people
American football placekickers
Canadian football placekickers
Hamilton Tiger-Cats players
Players of American football from Texas
Players of Canadian football from Texas
People from Katy, Texas
Texas A&M Aggies football players